The 2014 Oregon gubernatorial election was held on November 4, 2014, to elect the Governor of Oregon, concurrently with other elections in Oregon and across the United States.

Incumbent Democrat John Kitzhaber defeated Republican state legislator Dennis Richardson, winning his fourth overall, and second consecutive, four-year term as governor. The race was closer than expected due to recent revelations of potential ethical violations involving his fiancée, Cylvia Hayes. Most news outlets had called the election in his favor by 9:00 p.m. on election night, and with Kitzhaber thanking his supporters for a successful race, Richardson refused to concede due to the close tally. Four third party candidates also appeared on the ballot, with each winning less than 2% of the vote.

Kitzhaber and Richardson were nominated in the primary election on May 20, 2014. As of 2022, this is the most recent gubernatorial election in Oregon where Clatsop County supported the Republican candidate, and the most recent one where Tillamook County supported the Democratic candidate.

If Kitzhaber had served his full term, he would have become the second longest-serving governor in U.S. history. Kitzhaber, however, resigned as governor on February 18, 2015.

Background

Physician and then-President of the Oregon State Senate John Kitzhaber was first elected governor in 1994, and was re-elected in 1998. Term limits prevented him from running in 2002. He considered running in 2006, but decided not to; incumbent Democrat Ted Kulongoski was re-elected. In September 2009, Kitzhaber announced that he would seek a third term as governor in 2010. In May 2010, he won the Democratic primary with 65% of the vote, defeating former Secretary of State of Oregon Bill Bradbury. After a close general election campaign, Kitzhaber won the election with 49% to Republican nominee Chris Dudley's 48%.

Democratic primary

Candidates

Declared
 Ifeanyichukwu Chijioke Diru
 John Kitzhaber, incumbent governor

Results

Republican primary
A Republican had not won a statewide race in Oregon since incumbent Senator Gordon H. Smith was re-elected in 2002 and a Republican has not been elected Governor since Victor G. Atiyeh was re-elected in 1982. At the annual Dorchester Conference for activists in March 2013, Oregon Republicans acknowledged the difficulties they faced. At the Conference, "the lack of activity was so pronounced that the conference's Saturday night satirical show ran a video that began with an announcer intoning, "Now we go live to the 2014 Republican governor's debate." The camera then panned over a debate stage with two empty chairs, the monotony broken only by a broom-wielding janitor." High-profile Republicans have all passed on the election and while attendees split on whether the party needed to change its policies, they agreed that the party needed to be a "big tent" again.

Candidates

Declared
 Tim Carr, businessman
 Gordon Challstrom, businessman
 Bruce Cuff, real estate broker
 Darren Karr, businessman and candidate for Governor in 2010
 Mae Rafferty, timber merchant
 Dennis Richardson, state representative

Withdrew
 Jon Justesen, businessman and rancher

Declined
 Allen Alley, businessman, former Chairman of the Oregon Republican Party, nominee for Oregon State Treasurer in 2008 and candidate for Governor in 2010
 Chris Dudley, former NBA basketball player and nominee for Governor in 2010
 Bruce Hanna, state representative
 Gordon H. Smith, former U.S. Senator
 Greg Walden, U.S. Representative and Chairman of the National Republican Congressional Committee

Results

Third parties

Candidates

Declared
 Aaron Auer (Constitution Party)
 Paul Grad (Libertarian Party)
 Chris Henry (Oregon Progressive Party)
 Jason Levin (Pacific Green Party)

Additionally, under Oregon's Electoral fusion law, Democratic nominee John Kitzhaber was nominated by the Working Families Party of Oregon, and Republican nominee Dennis Richardson was nominated by the Independent Party of Oregon.

General election

Debates
Complete video of debate, September 26, 2014
Complete video of debate, October 14, 2014

Predictions

Polling

 ^ Internal poll for Dennis Richardson campaign

Results

See also
 2014 United States elections
 United States Senate election in Oregon, 2014

References

External links
 Oregon gubernatorial election, 2014 at Ballotpedia

Official campaign websites (Archived)
 John Kitzhaber for Governor incumbent
 Tim Carr for Governor
 Gordon Challstrom for Governor
 Bruce Cuff for Governor
 Jason Levin for Governor
 Dennis Richardson for Governor

2014
Governor
Oregon